Neospondylis is a genus of long-horned beetles in the family Cerambycidae. There are at least two described species in Neospondylis.

Species
These two species belong to the genus Neospondylis:
 Neospondylis mexicanus (Bates, 1879)
 Neospondylis upiformis (Mannerheim, 1843)

References

Further reading

 
 
 

Spondylidinae
Articles created by Qbugbot